Promethium(III) phosphate is an inorganic compound, a salt of promethium and phosphate, with the chemical formula of PmPO4. It is radioactive. Its hydrate can be obtained by precipitation of soluble promethium salt and diammonium hydrogen phosphate at pH 3~4 (or obtained by hydrothermal reaction ), and the hydrate can be obtained by burning at 960 °C to obtain the anhydrous form. Its standard enthalpy of formation is −464 kcal/mol.

References 

Promethium compounds
Phosphates